John of Biclaro, Biclar, or Biclarum (c. 540 – after 621), also Iohannes Biclarensis, was a Visigoth chronicler. He was born in Lusitania, in the city of Scallabis (modern Santarém in Portugal).  He was also bishop of Girona.

Early life 
He was educated at Constantinople, where he devoted between 7-17 years to the study of Latin and Greek.

Career

Imprisonment 
When he returned to his homeland, he was imprisoned for several years in Barcelona. Isidore of Seville ascribes this to his refusal to join the Arian Church of the Visigothic realm in Hispania.

Modern historians note that other contemporary Iberian sources, including John's own Chronicle do not attest a Visigothic campaign of persecution of Catholics until the revolt of Hermenegild divided Visigothic loyalties. The Visigothic persecutions of dissenters and Jews may be a more recent Catholic myth. Indeed, John wrote that, in 578, "Leovigild had peace to reside with his own people."

A more likely reason for John's detention was his lengthy stay at Constantinople, with the possibility that he might be a spy for the Byzantine governors in the far south of Iberia. An enforced stay in Barcelona certainly put him out of possible treasonous contact with the Byzantines. John does imply that Arians received favorable treatment under Leovigild, once, in connection with the Arian council convened by Leovigild in 580, where Catholic bishops were ignored.

Monastery 
After Leovigild's death in 586, John was released and founded a Benedictine monastery at Biclaro (the exact site is undetermined), where he presided as abbot and finished his Chronicle (in 590), before he was appointed Catholic Bishop of Girona under the new episcopal government.

Bishop 
John took part in the synods of Zaragoza (592), of Barcelona (599), and of Egara (Municipium Flavium Egara) (614). His chronicle, which is a continuation (from 567) of the chronicle of Victor of Tunnuna, in Africa (Chronicon continuans Victorem Tunnunensem), reaches to the year 590. It was printed as early as 1600. It is the most complete and reliable authority on Leovigild's stormy reign, and on the Visigothic conversion from Arianism to Catholicism.

Three other chronicles cover parts of the Visigothic rule of Hispania: the bishop Hydatius, bishop Isidore of Seville, both of the doctrinally unified Catholic Visigothic establishment, and the fragmentary but apparently secular Chronicle of Zaragoza.

A bishop of Girona known as Johannes Gerundensis ("John of Girona") seems to have been a successor of the chronicler, though some have identified him with the chronicler.

References

Further reading:

English translation of John's chronicle by Aymenn Jawad Al-Tamimi: https://aymennaltamimi.substack.com/p/the-chronicle-of-john-of-biclaro

6th-century births
7th-century deaths
6th-century historians
6th-century people of the Visigothic Kingdom
7th-century people of the Visigothic Kingdom
Benedictines
Medieval Portugal
Historians of Spain
Chroniclers
People from Santarém, Portugal
7th-century Christian monks
6th-century Latin writers
7th-century Latin writers
7th-century historians